Allagopappus is a genus of flowering plants in the daisy family described as a genus in 1828.

Allagopappus is endemic to the Canary Islands.

 Species
 Allagopappus canariensis (Willd.) Greuter - Canary Islands
 Allagopappus viscosissimus Bolle - Gran Canaria

References

Inuleae
Asteraceae genera
Flora of the Canary Islands